Theodor Homann (28 April 1948 – 11 April 2010) was a German footballer, coach and businessman. He played for 1. FC Nürnberg, VfR Mannheim, Westfalia Herne and Wuppertaler SV. He died unexpectedly of heart failure. He was married and had a daughter. He was born and died in Werne.

References

External links
 
 Obituary 

1948 births
2010 deaths
People from Werne
Sportspeople from Arnsberg (region)
German footballers
SC Westfalia Herne players
VfR Mannheim players
SC Westfalia Herne managers
VfR Mannheim managers
Bundesliga players
2. Bundesliga players
Association football midfielders
Footballers from North Rhine-Westphalia
German football managers